Frans Banninck Cocq (sometimes incorrectly spelled as Banning), lord of Purmerland and Ilpendam (1605–1655) was a burgemeester (mayor), knight and military person of Amsterdam in the mid-17th century. He belonged to the wealthy and powerful Dutch patriciate of the Dutch Golden Age. Banninck Cocq is best known as the central figure in Rembrandt's masterpiece The Night Watch.

Biography

Background and Family 

Frans was the son of Jan Jansz Cock, a local pharmacist of German descendant in the Warmoesstraat and Lysbeth Frans Banninck from an upper class family of the city's patriciate. He was baptized on 27 February 1605 in the nearby Old Church. As his parents were not married, it caused a scandal, but on 17 September of the same year they went to the townhall to notice the marriage. Both were related to Cornelis Hooft. Frans, who seems to have had one deaf brother  studied law in Poitiers  and Bourges between 1625 and 1627.

In 1630 Banninck Cocq married Maria Overlander van Purmerland, daughter of Volkert Overlander (her sister Geertruid Overlander (1609–1634) was married to Cornelis de Graeff), merchant and one of the founders of the Dutch East Trading Company, and a few times burgemeester of Amsterdam. Through his marriage he get linked by marriage with the powerful Bicker and De Graeff families and also to Johan de Witt, Grand Pensionary of Holland. When Frans' father-in-law died, Banninck Cocq inherited his properties, including a canal house, the castle of Ilpenstein north of Amsterdam along with the title Lord of Purmerland and Ilpendam. Banninck Cocq decorated the main hall with portraits of his wife's ancestors. The couple had no children.

Political Career 
Around 1630 Banninck Cocq became schepen and in 1634 he succeeded his father-in-law as a member of the city council. In 1650 he was appointed burgemeester (mayor) of Amsterdam. In 1651, 1653 and 1654 he was re-elected. He worked with his brother-in-law Cornelis de Graeff and Johan Huydecoper van Maarsseveen.

Banninck Cocq is also depicted in the Bartholomeus van der Helst portrait of The Governors of the Longbow Civic Guards, 1653, now in the Amsterdam Museum.

Military career, Night watch 
In 1635 Banninck Cocq was a lieutenant of the Amsterdam civil guard (militia) of Wijk I and captain of that of Wijk II from about 1635 to about 1646. From about 1646 to 1650 he was a colonel.

Banninck Cocq is primarily known today for being depicted in a painting by Rembrandt van Rijn commissioned in 1638, which shows Cocq and his company of civil guards. Although known as The Night Watch (1642), this is not the original title; at that time it was in fact unusual to title paintings but if indeed it had a name, the more correct one would be "The Company of Captain Frans Banning Cocq and Lieutenant Willem van Ruytenburch". The painting is notable, among other things, for its huge size: approximately 3.35 m x 4.26 m (11 ft by 14 ft).

Death 
Frans Banninck Cocq was buried on 6 January 1655; his tomb chapel is located in the Oude Kerk.

References

External links

Marriage portraits of Frans Banning Cocq and his wife Maria Overlander by an unknown painter

Succession template

1605 births
1650s deaths
Nobility from Amsterdam
Lords of Purmerland and Ilpendam
Mayors of Amsterdam
Burials at the Oude Kerk, Amsterdam